Mehdi Kiani (born July 23, 1978) is an Iranian football midfielder who played for Sanat Naft in the Iran Pro League.

Club career

In 2009, Kiani joined Shahin Bushehr after spending the previous two seasons at Mes Kerman F.C.

Club career statistics

 Assist Goals

Honours

Club
Hazfi Cup
Runner up:1
2011–12 with Shahin Bushehr

References

1978 births
Living people
Iranian footballers
Association football midfielders
Shahin Bushehr F.C. players
Sanat Mes Kerman F.C. players
Damash Gilan players